Underworld U.S.A. (also known as Underworld USA) is a 1961 American neo-noir crime film produced, written, and directed by Samuel Fuller. It tells the story of a 14-year-old boy who goes to enormous lengths to get revenge against the mobsters who beat his father to death. It stars Cliff Robertson, Dolores Dorn, and Beatrice Kay.

Plot
The 14-year-old Tolly Devlin and his mother figure (Beatrice Kay) see four hoods beat his father to death. Tolly vows to avenge his father, but he discovers that Farrar, the one perpetrator he recognized when his father was being beaten, has been arrested and imprisoned for life. Tolly becomes a petty criminal and safecracker. Many years later, during a stint in prison, Tolly discovers that Farrar is on his deathbed in the prison medical ward. Tolly manipulates his way into the room and tricks Farrar into revealing the names of the other three killers before he dies.

The remaining killers have risen to be powerful lieutenants in the crime syndicate, so Tolly works his way into their organization. In the process, he saves and then begins a romance with a low-level syndicate money-runner named  Cuddles (Dolores Dorn). Becoming a secret informant for the police, Tolly ends up playing both sides in his cagey campaign to bring down the remaining mobsters. Tolly's machinations convince syndicate boss Connors to have each of the three lieutenants murdered by the syndicate's ruthless assassin, Gus.

Having accomplished his goal, Tolly plans to go straight and marry Cuddles. The police warn him that without bringing down Connors, he has no chance of getting out alive, but Tolly does not believe them. As Tolly prepares to leave, Gus arrives and informs him that Connors has assigned them to kill Cuddles and several other innocent witnesses. Tolly realizes that Connors must be stopped. He knocks out Gus and turns him in to the police, and then confronts Connors and his men. Tolly kills Connors, but is shot during the struggle. He stumbles into an alley and dies.

Cast
 Cliff Robertson as Tolly Devlin
 Dolores Dorn as Cuddles
 Beatrice Kay as Sandy
 Paul Dubov as Gela
 Robert Emhardt as Earl Connors
 Larry Gates as John Driscoll
 Richard Rust as Gus Cottahee
 Gerald Milton as Gunther
 Allan Gruener as Smith

Production
Producer Ray Stark asked Fuller to write and direct a film based on the title of a magazine article written by Joseph F. Dinneen. Fuller also was inspired by a book, Here Is to Crime, by newspaperman Riley Cooper.

An opening scene with a Union of Prostitutes was deleted by Sam Briskin and other Columbia executives. Fuller's character Tolly is a loner motivated by revenge using the United States government and his own devices to even the score.  Fuller heard the reaction of a real-life gangster who reportedly said, "If only my son would have that kind of affection for me!".

Reception

Critical response
Film critic Dennis Schwartz liked the film, and wrote, "Samuel Fuller's revenge crime thriller is shot in the same brisk and violent manner he shoots his war films. The timely crime film hopes to cash in on the public's thirst for mob stories, as it takes place after the well-covered mob gathering in Apalachin, New York; Fuller based his film on a series of exposé articles in The Saturday Evening Post ... Fuller's violent noir film shows the inhumanity of the soldiers in the war on crime, where neither the syndicate or Tolly react with basic human responses. Their drive to succeed overrides everything, even love. The Federal Bureau of Investigation is shown as stymied without the help of the public coming forth with information or willing to act as witnesses despite the risks, but the lawmen do not play fair by not telling how dangerous it is to be a witness against the mob."

Legacy
A wanted poster of Tolly Devlin appears in a police station in Columbia's film of Sail a Crooked Ship (1961).

Preservation
The Academy Film Archive preserved Underworld U.S.A. in 2000.

References

External links
 
 
 
 
 

1961 films
1960s crime thriller films
American black-and-white films
Columbia Pictures films
1960s English-language films
Films about organized crime in the United States
Films based on newspaper and magazine articles
Films directed by Samuel Fuller
Films scored by Harry Sukman
American neo-noir films
1960s American films